Whisler may refer to:

 Mount Whisler, Nunavut, Canada
 Whisler Island, Nunavut, Canada

People with the surname
 Wes Whisler, United States baseball player

See also
 Whistler (disambiguation)